"Figured You Out" is a song by Canadian rock band Nickelback. It was released on November 3, 2003, as the second single from the group's fourth studio album, The Long Road (2003).

Copyright infringement
In 2011, Vancouver-based band Econoline Crush sued Nickelback for copyright infringement over the song, claiming it "bears a substantial similarity" to their 1997 single, "All That You Are".

Track listings
European maxi-CD single
 "Figured You Out" – 3:48
 "Too Bad" (live at MTV Unplugged) – 4:28
 "Leader of Men" (live at MTV Unplugged) – 3:44
 "Figured You Out" (video)

Australian CD single
 "Figured You Out" – 3:47
 "Too Bad" (live at MTV Unplugged) – 4:28
 "Where Do I Hide" (live at MTV Unplugged) – 3:42

Charts

Weekly charts

Year-end charts

Certifications

Release history

References

2003 songs
2004 singles
Nickelback songs
Roadrunner Records singles
Song recordings produced by Joey Moi
Songs involved in plagiarism controversies
Songs written by Chad Kroeger
Songs written by Mike Kroeger
Songs written by Ryan Peake